Alfred Newman Gilbey (1901–1998) was a British Roman Catholic priest and monsignor.  He was the longest-serving chaplain to the University of Cambridge, England. He has been described as the best-known Roman Catholic priest in England during the last quarter of the 20th century.

Early life (1901–1932)
Gilbey was born at Mark Hall, near Harlow, Essex, on 13 July 1901, fifth son of Newman Gilbey, JP and María Victorina de Ysasi. Newman Gilbey's father, Alfred, of Wooburn House, Wooburn, Buckinghamshire, had founded a successful wine business with his brother, Sir Walter Gilbey, 1st Baronet. A maternal great-grandfather was Don Manuel María González y Angel, founder of a Spanish wine and sherry bodega González Byass. Educated by Jesuits at Beaumont College, he went on to study modern history at Trinity College, Cambridge in 1920, during which time he became chairman of the Fisher Society at the chaplaincy; he was also a member the University Pitt Club. He funded his own training as a priest at the Pontifical Beda College in Rome, being ordained "under his own patrimony" by Bishop Doubleday of Brentwood in 1929.

Fisher House and retirement (1932–1998)
In 1932, Gilbey became Catholic chaplain to the University of Cambridge, residing at Fisher House. Gilbey exerted a quiet but considerable influence around the university, maintaining links with the colleges and overseeing many converts to Catholicism. He was instrumental in defending Fisher House, as from 1949 the Cambridge City Council planned to demolish the buildings in the area to make way for the Lion Yard development. After petitioning led by Gilbey, who maintained that the chaplaincy would be demolished "over his dead body", Fisher House was spared from the compulsory purchase order and remains standing to this day.

Gilbey retired from the chaplaincy in 1965, the final year of the Second Vatican Council. Unhappy with the Fisher Society's decision to admit women to the chaplaincy, who had been allowed to be full members of the university in 1947, Gilbey decided to leave rather than compromise his traditionalist beliefs. He took up permanent residence at the Travellers Club in London, remaining active into his nineties. During this time he wrote the catechetical book, We Believe (1983), making a trip to the United States in 1995 to promote it.

Death and legacy
In early 1998, Gilbey moved to Nazareth House in Hammersmith, London, a nursing home. He died two months later, on 26 March 1998. His funeral was held in the Brompton Oratory on 6 April with a Tridentine Solemn Mass. He is buried in the courtyard of Fisher House in Cambridge. A Requiem Mass for the repose of his soul is sung, again in the Tridentine form, annually at Trinity College.

References

Further reading

1901 births
1998 deaths
Alumni of Trinity College, Cambridge
20th-century English Roman Catholic priests
Catholic Church in Cambridge
Burials in Cambridgeshire